The 1958 Victorian Football Association season was the 77th season of the Australian rules football competition. The premiership was won by the Williamstown Football Club, after it defeated Moorabbin in the grand final replay on 4 October by 32 points.

Association Membership

The 1958 season marked the beginning of the expansion of the Association from fourteen clubs to twenty clubs. The Association had been planning for a scheme to expand into the fastest developing outer suburbs since as early as 1946, when it was still playing under and trying to promote the throw-pass rules. This current plan was made public in 1956, when the Association announced its intention to expand to twenty teams, proposing a vision which focused on expansion further into the outer suburbs of greater Melbourne – Dandenong to the south-east, Heidelberg or Greensborough to the north-east, Sunshine to the west and Frankston to the south – as well as a proposed expansion into the regional markets of Ballarat and Bendigo.

Between 1958 and 1966, a total of seven new clubs – Dandenong, Frankston, Mordialloc, Sunshine, Waverley and Werribee from greater Melbourne and Geelong West from regional Victoria – joined the Association, as well as Caulfield (in the form of a merger with Brighton); and with the departure of Moorabbin in 1964, this brought the number of clubs to twenty.

In 1958, the first two new clubs of this expansion joined the Association to bring numbers to sixteen: Mordialloc and Dandenong, both switching from the Federal District League. Mordialloc announced in August 1957 that it had accepted the Association's invitation, and revealed that it had been approached to join at short notice for the 1957 season, but had declined. Dandenong voted to accept its invitation in September 1957, although only by a small 53–49 majority. The Federal District League, which was not consulted prior to the Association extending the invitations to its teams and had lost Moorabbin the same way in 1951, was unhappy with the "back-door methods" that the Association had taken.

Part of the Association's plans to expand to twenty clubs was the partitioning of the Association into two divisions of ten teams. The Association ultimately split into a first division and a second division with promotion and relegation between them from 1961; but, the other alternative considered attempted to reduce the travel burden between outlying suburbs by partitioning the Association into northern and southern divisions, with the winner of each division to contest the Association-wide premiership at the end of the season. To trial the geographic division structure, the clubs were divided into northern and southern sections in the 1958 fixture, and clubs were drawn to play other clubs in their own section twice and clubs from the other section only once; but, the final results were compiled into a single ladder and a single finals series.

The Camberwell Football Club, which was struggling due to poor support, had considered withdrawing from the Association prior to the start of the season, but decided to remain. Northcote and Brighton both operated as amateur clubs throughout the season, and Preston became amateur after June 11, abandoning its £4/10/– match payments.

Premiership
The home-and-home season was played over only eighteen matches, a reduction from the twenty matches played in previous years. No matches were held for the two weekends of the Interstate Carnival, which was held in Melbourne. The top four clubs then contested a finals series under the Page–McIntyre system to determine the premiers for the season.

Ladder

Finals

Awards
The leading goalkicker for the home-and-home season for the third consecutive year was Bob Bonnett (Port Melbourne), who kicked 76 goals.
The J. J. Liston Trophy was won by retiring amateur Keith Woolnough (Northcote), best known as the vice-captain of the VFL-VFA team in the demonstration match at the 1956 Summer Olympics. Woolnough polled 35 votes, to win ahead of Terry Devery (Box Hill), who was second with 29 votes, and John Martin (Williamstown), who was third with 27 votes.
Coburg won the seconds premiership. Coburg 7.9 (51) defeated Moorabbin 5.13 (43) in the Grand Final, played as a curtain raiser to the firsts Grand Final on 27 September.

Notable events

Interstate Carnival
The Association fielded its representative team in the 1958 Melbourne Carnival, competing in Section 1. The team was captained by Camberwell's Ken Ross.

The Association finished last with a record of 1–3 and a poorer percentage than South Australia; the Association's final match of the carnival was against the then-winless South Australia, but South Australia's large win was enough to consign the Association to last place. As a result, the Association was relegated directly to Section 2 for the following carnival.

Barry Metcalfe (Mordialloc) was named in the All-Australian team on the wing; he was the only Association player named in the team.

Other notable events
As had occurred in 1957, from the start of the season the match of the round was played on the preceding Wednesday night under floodlights at the South Melbourne Cricket Ground; but, the practice was abandoned after the match on 7 May was postponed due to inclement weather. The risk of worsening weather conditions in winter, disruptions to the clubs' training and social schedules, and poorer night crowds than had been seen in 1957 were the main reasons for abandoning the night matches. Night matches did not return in 1959.
A grand final replay was held after the Grand Final between Moorabbin and Williamstown finished as a draw. The Association had not made contingency plans for the availability of the St Kilda Cricket Ground in the event of a replay being required, and the ground needed to be prepared for St Kilda's first district cricket match on 18 October, but the Victorian Cricket Association and Carlton Cricket Club agreed to move the match to Carlton to accommodate the replay.

External links
List of VFA/VFL premiers

References

Victorian Football League seasons
VFL